The Wissinger Laber is the right headwater of the Breitenbrunner Laber in the Franconian Jura in Bavaria, Germany.

The Wissinger Laber arises south-east of Freihausen. It runs in a south-east direction through the village of Ittelhofen to the village of Wissing. Passing Aumühle the Wissinger Laber reaches Breitenbrunn where it issues together with the Bachhaupter Laber into the Breitenbrunner Laber.

See also
List of rivers of Bavaria

References

Rivers of Bavaria
Rivers of Germany